Champlain was a former regional county municipality and census division in the Canadian province of Quebec. It ceased to exist when it amalgamated into the expanded city of Longueuil on January 1, 2002.

It was the smallest in area and most populous regional county municipality.

Champlain RCM consisted of:
 the City of Brossard
 the City of Greenfield Park
 the City of LeMoyne
 the City of Longueuil
 the City of Saint-Hubert
 the City of Saint-Lambert

On January 1, 2002, all of the above, plus Boucherville and Saint-Bruno-de-Montarville, amalgamated into the expanded city of Longueuil. On January 1, 2006, however, Brossard, Boucherville, Saint-Bruno-de-Montarville, and Saint-Lambert demerged and became independent again; however, they remain part of the urban agglomeration of Longueuil.

See also
 Municipal history of Quebec

References

Former regional county municipalities in Quebec
Longueuil
Populated places disestablished in 2002
2002 disestablishments in Quebec